Jennifer Taylor (born 26 January 1976) is an Argentinean alpine skier. She competed in the downhill and combined events at the 1994 Winter Olympics and finished in 44th and 25th place, respectively.

References

Argentine female alpine skiers
Olympic alpine skiers of Argentina
Alpine skiers at the 1994 Winter Olympics
1976 births
Living people